Victoria Forde (April 21, 1896 – July 24, 1964) was an American silent film actress.

Biography

Born in New York City, Victoria Forde was the daughter of Broadway actress Eugenie Forde who got her into films with Biograph at age 14. In 1912, at age 16, she signed with Nestor Studios to make comedy films under director Al Christie. That same year, her mother made her film debut, appearing with her daughter in A Pair of Jacks (1912). During Forde's five-year stay with Nestor, Al Christie would direct her in one hundred and sixteen short films.

Forde joined Selig Studios and became a star of Western films, frequently performing opposite cowboy actor Tom Mix. A personal relationship developed between them and, in 1917, she and Mix signed with the Fox Film Corporation where they continued to perform together. She became his fourth wife in 1918; the following year, after having performed in 176 film shorts, she gave up her film career to stay at home with their daughter, Thomasina. The marriage ended in divorce in 1931.

Death
Forde died in Beverly Hills on July 24, 1964. Being of the Catholic faith she was interred in the Holy Cross Cemetery in Culver City, California.

Partial filmography
 Love in Quarantine (1910)
 When the Heart Calls (1912)
 His Only Son (1912)
 The Yaqui Cur (1913)
 The Battle of Bull Run (1913)
 When Lizzie Got Her Polish (1914)
 The Golden Thought (1917; 1924-rerelease)
 Western Blood (1918)

References

External links

 
 

American silent film actresses
American film actresses
Western (genre) film actresses
Actresses from New York City
1896 births
1964 deaths
Burials at Holy Cross Cemetery, Culver City
20th-century American actresses